The Wagon Wheel Gap Railroad Station, in Creede, Colorado, was built in 1883.  It was listed on the National Register of Historic Places in 1976.  It was a station on a narrow-gauge railroad line that opened in July, 1883.

References

Railway stations on the National Register of Historic Places in Colorado
Railway stations in the United States opened in 1883
National Register of Historic Places in Mineral County, Colorado
Transportation buildings and structures in Mineral County, Colorado
Former railway stations in Colorado